William Craig Moore (5 April 1890 – 12 May 1956) was a British track and field athlete who competed in the 1912 Summer Olympics. In 1912 he was eliminated in the first round of the 1500 metres competition. He also helped Great Britain to qualify for the final in the 3000 metre team race. In the final, however, he was the weakest link of the team. Nevertheless, he was awarded with a bronze medal.

References

External links
William Moore's profile at the British Olympic Committee
William Moore's profile at Sports Reference.com

1890 births
1956 deaths
British male middle-distance runners
Olympic athletes of Great Britain
Athletes (track and field) at the 1912 Summer Olympics
Olympic bronze medallists for Great Britain
Medalists at the 1912 Summer Olympics
Olympic bronze medalists in athletics (track and field)